Guosheng Yin (born 1976) is a statistician, a data scientist, an educator and a researcher in Biostatistics, Statistics and machine learning, AI. Presently, Guosheng Yin is a Chair in Statistics in Department of Mathematics at Imperial College London. Previously, he served as the Head of Department and the Patrick S C Poon Endowed Chair in Statistics and Actuarial Science, at the University of Hong Kong. Before he joined the University of Hong Kong, Yin worked at the University of Texas M.D. Anderson Cancer Center till 2009 as a tenured Associate Professor of Biostatistics. 

As an active researcher, he has published two books and over 220 scientific manuscripts in various peer-reviewed journals and conferences.

Education
Guosheng Yin obtained his Bachelor's degree (BS) in Physics at Jilin University (Changchun, China) in 1995, Master's Degree (MA) in Physics at Temple University (PA, USA) in 1997 and earned Ph.D. in Biostatistics from the University of North Carolina at Chapel Hill (NC, USA) in 2003.

Research and career
Yin's research interests include AI, deep learning, machine learning, Bayesian methods, clinical trial methodologies, adaptive designs, survival analysis, high-dimensional data and change-point analysis. He started as an Assistant Professor and worked as a tenured Associate Professor of Biostatistics in the University of Texas M.D. Anderson Cancer Center. Then, he joined the Department of Statistics and Actuarial Science at the University of Hong Kong as an Associate Professor in 2009 and promoted to a tenured Professor in 2014. Since 2017, he has been serving as the Head of Department of Statistics and Actuarial Science, and he became an endowed chair as the Patrick S C Poon Professor in Statistics and Actuarial Science in 2018.

Yin pioneered new statistical techniques to refine precision medicine, design adaptive clinical trials, and facilitate drug development. His versatile designs for clinical trials include adaptive phase I dose-finding methods, drug-combination studies, designs with late-onset outcomes and phase I/II trial designs. His ground-breaking research has ushered in advanced regression models and computational algorithms, enabling statistical modeling and theory application. He developed Bayesian generalized method of moments, established the connection between Bayesian posterior probability and p-value in hypothesis testing and further made a reconcilable interpretation on the well-known Lindley paradox. Yin has included machine learning and artificial intelligence in his research to amplify the precision and applicability of statistical science in solving real-world problems. Recently, he led a research team that integrated radiography and computer vision to develop a digital online diagnostic system for COVID-19 based on chest CT scans.

Awards 
He has won recognition from various premier institutions:

 Fellow of Institute of Mathematical Statistics (IMS) (2021) 
 World's top 1% of scientists by Clarivate Analytics (2015, 2019, 2021)  
 Fellow of American Statistical Association (ASA) (2013)  
 Elected Member of International Statistical Institute (ISI) (2012)  
 James E. Grizzle Distinguished Alumni Award, Department of Biostatistics, University of North Carolina at Chapel Hill (2009)

Publications
Yin is the author of two books and numerous research papers with more than 220 peer-reviewed publications in international scientific journals and conferences; the following list names a few of them:

Statistical Methodologies

 Crystallization learning with the Delaunay triangulation. International Conference on Machine Learning ICML 2021. 
 Demystify Lindley's paradox by connecting p-value and posterior probability. Statistics and Its Interface 2021.        
 Reconnecting p-value and posterior probability under one- and two-sided tests. The American Statistician 2021, DOI: 10.1080/00031305.2020.1717621      
 Online COVID-19 diagnosis with chest CT images: Lesion-attention deep neural networks. 26th ACM SIGKDD Conference on Knowledge Discovery and Data Mining, 2020.         
 Bayesian model averaging continual reassessment method in phase I clinical trials. Journal of the American Statistical Association 104, 954–968, 2009.         
 Bayesian generalized method of moments (with discussion). Bayesian Analysis 4, 191–208; Rejoinder, 217–222, 2009.

He has published two books in the areas of clinical trial design and methods:       
 Statistical Design and Analysis in Clinical Trials (in Chinese). Higher Education Press, China, 2018.         
 Clinical Trial Design: Bayesian and Frequentist Adaptive Methods. Wiley Series in Probability and Statistics. Hoboken, New Jersey, USA, 2012.

References

External links
 Google Scholar -Guosheng Yin

Living people
Academic staff of the University of Hong Kong
Year of birth missing (living people)